Raktha Kanneeru is a 2003 Indian Kannada-language film directed by Sadhu Kokila, starring Upendra and Ramya Krishna. The film was produced by Munirathna and was later dubbed in Telugu. The screenplay and dialogues of the film were written by Upendra and the music was composed by Sadhu Kokila.

Though it was initially claimed to be a remake of the 1954 Tamil film Ratha Kanneer, the director clarified that his film was based on a Kannada play which was later adapted in Tamil as a play and then subsequently into the 1954 film. Upon release, the film was successful at the box office. It was followed by a spiritual sequel titled Katari Veera Surasundarangi released in 2012.

Plot 
Mohan is a rich guy who returns from another country, after his studies but he is very arrogant towards people who are below his financial standards and even towards his own mother. He gets attracted to a local prostitute Kantha and even submits all his riches and property to her. On his mother's insistence he marries a girl, Chandra, who is his cousin who is a traditional and a village girl. On his first night Mohan gets to find out she is not of his culture and leaves for Kantha. Gradually he loses all of his wealth and is left only with his house. Mohan gets addicted to alcohol and Kantha so much that he doesn't even attend his mother's funeral and perform her last rites which are carried out by his friend Balu.

Balu advises Mohan many times to mend his ways but Mohan turns down all his advice. Gradually, Mohan is affected by leprosy, and with no money left for his treatment, Kantha throws him out of her house. Due to a heavy storm, Mohan loses one of his legs and eyesight and eventually has to make do by begging, and one day he reaches out to his wife Chandra who now works in a house as a maid. Neither recognise each other as Mohan has a deformed appearance and cannot see her. But she feeds him daily out of humanity.

Searching for Mohan, his friend Balu comes to Chandra, and during their conversation, the trio recognise each other. Mohan asks Chandra and Balu to marry each other so that Chandra doesn't need to lead a pitiful life. He also asks Balu to establish his statues in the city in the deformed form so that persons like him can take his life as an example and mend their ways to lead a happy life. After so many years, Balu and Chandra are shown at Mohan's statue, crying in his memory.

Cast 
Upendra as Mohan
Ramya Krishna as Kantha
Abhirami as Chandra
Kumar Bangarappa as Balu
Jyothilakshmi as Kantha's mother
Doddanna
 Arif Ali
Bank Janardhan as Police inspector
Sadhu Kokila as Kantha's uncle
J. V. Somayajulu as Chandras father
Kota Srinivasa Rao
Sudhakar
Kallu Chidambaram as beggar

Production 
The film was originally set to be directed by Shivamani, but he was replaced by Sadhu Kokila, making his directorial debut.

Soundtrack 
The music was composed by Sadhu Kokila. The audio had another song Ee deshadalli  ( with the tune of the Hindi song Kaliyon Ka Chaman) was not featured in the film.

Reception 
Raktha Kanneerus BKT distribution rights were sold at a record price of 1.6 Crore. The film went on to break many opening box office records upon release. From Bangalore alone, the film collected a share of more than 1 Crore in its first week. Reviewing the Telugu-dubbed version, The Hindu wrote, "Upendra's performance is very good, he lives the role. Unfortunately, the dubbing voice and the accent used for him sound artificial". Jeevi of Idlebrain wrote, "This film is a typical Upendra film. His histrionics and the dialogues written to him are the plus points".

Future 
The film was followed by a semi sequel titled Katari Veera Surasundarangi released in 2012. A 3D romantic fantasy film, it was partly a sequel to Raktha Kanneeru. It was also the first full-length 3D film in Kannada cinema. Upendra reprises his role of the highly educated rich-man turned beggar Mohan now in hell, where he meets his look alike gangster son (Upendra again) who is killed in a gang war. The film tells the story of how Mohan's son falls in love with Indra's daughter Indraja (Ramya) in Indraloka (heaven) and how he faces the challenges of Brahma, Yama and other Devatas of Indraloka to marry Indraja. The film was hugely successful although not as much as its predecessor.

References

External links 

2000s Kannada-language films
2003 directorial debut films
2003 films
Films directed by Sadhu Kokila
Films set in Bangalore
Indian films based on plays